Swimming at the 1960 Summer Paralympics consisted of 62 events, 32 for men and 30 for women.

Each race had no more than three competitors so every swimmer completing a race was guaranteed a medal. All the swimmers successfully completed their races, and every swimmer at the Games therefore earned a medal.

Medal summary

Medal table

Participating nations

Men's events

Women's events

References 

 

 
1960 Summer Paralympics events
1960
Paralympics